Jesse Benavides (born November 8, 1963 in Corpus Christi, Texas) is an American former professional boxer. His professional boxing record was 40–5–1.

Amateur career 
Jesse Benavides was the 1981 National AAU (106lbs) Light Flyweight Champion and 1983 National USA/ABF (119lbs) Bantamweight Champion. Jesse Benavides was a four time Texas State Golden Gloves Champion. Jesse was the 1981 (106lbs) Light Flyweight National Golden Gloves Champion, the 1982 (112lbs) Flyweight National Golden Gloves Champion, and the 1983 (119lbs) Bantamweight National Golden Gloves Champion. Jesse was also the 1981 National Sports Festival (106lbs) Light Flyweight Champion, and the National Sports Festival (112lbs) Flyweight National Champion. Jesse was the 1983 (119lbs) Bantamweight North America Champion and competed in the 1983 World Cup in Rome, Italy. Jesse Benavides was runner up at the 1984 U.S. Olympic Trials.

Professional career 
Jesse Benavides began his Professional career in 1984 under manager Emanuel Steward's Kronk Gym and was trained by Tony Ayala Sr. Jesse won his first professional title, the United States Boxing Association (USBA) 122lbs Championship, on 11/20/1987. On 05/24/1991, Jesse Benavides, won the WBO 122lbs super bantamweight World Championship, with a win over Orlando Fernandez of Puerto Rico. Jesse defended the belt once before losing it in London, England to Duke McKenzie in 1992. On 05/21/1993 Jesse Benavides won the North American Boxing Federation (NABF) 122 lbs. Championship and earned a title fight against Tracy Harris Patterson. Benavides loss a close unanimous decision. He also loss a close decision to Kevin Kelly for the WBC Featherweight Title in 1994. Benavides retired in 1996 after a KO loss to Marco Antonio Barrera for the WBO super bantamweight title.

Awards: Jesse Benavides won the Outstanding Boxer Award of the 1982 Golden Gloves National Tournament, in 1983 Benavides was the winner of the Sullivan Award for Amateur Boxer Of the Year. In 1991 Jesse Benavides was honored to be named the recipient of the Congressional Hispanic Caucus, Medallion of Excellence Award, for Role Model of the Year in Washington DC. Jesse also was awarded WBO Fight Of The Year in 1991 at the WBO Convention.

See also
List of super-bantamweight boxing champions

External links
 

1963 births
Living people
Boxers from Texas
People from Corpus Christi, Texas
featherweight boxers
Super-bantamweight boxers
World super-bantamweight boxing champions
World Boxing Organization champions
American male boxers